An author mill is a publisher that relies on producing large numbers of small-run books by different authors, as opposed to a smaller number of works published in larger numbers. The term was coined by Victoria Strauss of Writer Beware, as a parallel formation from diploma mill, an unaccredited college or university that offers degrees without regard to academic achievement, and puppy mill, a breeding operation that produces large numbers of puppies for sale with little regard for breed purity, puppy placement, health, or socialization.

Predatory open access publishing is a closely related practice. However, the aims and the business model are rather different: predatory publishers will charge the author up front for publishing in a supposed scientific journal. Since academic evaluation is largely based on publication count or other bibliometrics, even well-meaning authors may be willing to pay to bolster their career prospects.

Definition
As described by Writer Beware, an author mill is:

Victoria Strauss has used the examples of PublishAmerica and VDM Publishing to illustrate the concept of author mill. More precisely, she has characterized VDM as "an academic author mill".

Business model

Typically, an author mill does the cheapest possible job of production; it sets high cover prices and prints its books "on demand."  The books are listed with online booksellers such as amazon.com and bn.com, and on the publisher's website.  Any marketing, promotion, or physical bookstore placement is up to the authors themselves.  While authors are not "required" to buy any of their own books, authors who wish to find readers discover that they need to buy their own books for resale.

The rise of the author mill is based on the rise of the online bookselling industry and digital printing technology which makes it cheap to print books on demand.
The necessary ingredients are:

 Minimal editorial gatekeeping
 Low production costs (acquiring/editing/designing the book)
 Low set-up charges for reproducing the book
 The power to set the cover price high enough to make a profit on a small number of average sales
 A relatively predictable number of sales to the author, the author's family, and the author's friends.

See also
Accreditation mill 
 Diploma mill 
 Ordination mill 
 Contract cheating
 Essay mill
  Vanity publishing
 Nova Publishers
 Atlanta Nights
 Self-publishing

References

Publishing